State Road 462 is a short three-mile (4.8 km) spur route in southwestern Harrison County, Indiana.

Route description
State Road 462 begins at State Road 62 and runs generally south through heavily wooded country. It terminates at the O'Bannon Woods State Park and Cold Friday Road.

Major intersections

References

462
Transportation in Harrison County, Indiana